Ypsolopha pseudoparallela is a moth of the family Ypsolophidae. It is known from Honshu island in Japan.

The length of the forewings is 8.8-10.1 mm.

Etymology
The specific name is a combination of the Greek pseudes (meaning false) and the specific name of the superficially similar species Ypsolopha parallela.

References

Ypsolophidae
Moths of Japan